A flume is a man-made gravity chute for water, with raised walls.

Flume or The Flume may also refer to:

 Flume (musician), an Australian electronic musician, producer and DJ
 Flume (album), his eponymous 2012 album
 Flume Gorge, a natural gorge in Franconia Notch State Park, New Hampshire, United States
 The Flume (Alton Towers), a log ride in Staffordshire
 "Flume", a song by Bon Iver from the 2007 album For Emma, Forever Ago
 Flume, an alternative name for a recreational water slide
 Werner Flume (1908–2009), a German jurist

Other uses
 Apache Flume, a service for collecting, aggregating, and moving large amounts of log data
 Log flume, used to transport lumber and logs down mountainous terrain to a sawmill by using flowing water
 Log flume (ride), amusement rides consisting of a water flume and artificial hollow logs or boats

See also
 Flame (disambiguation)
 Fluke (disambiguation)